Zinc transporter ZIP4 is a transmembrane protein which in humans is encoded by the SLC39A4 gene.  It is associated with acrodermatitis enteropathica.

See also
 Solute carrier family

References

External links
  OMIM entry on ACRODERMATITIS ENTEROPATHICA, ZINC-DEFICIENCY TYPE; AEZ

Solute carrier family